Nova Poshta is a private Ukrainian postal and courier company that provides logistics and related services  for individuals and businesses. Its main competitor is the country's post office, Ukrposhta.

History 
The Company was founded in 2001 by Vyacheslav Klymov and Volodymyr Popereshnyuk.

In 2018, the company delivered over 174 million shipments, through the company's 6000 branches throughout the country. In 2015, the company expanded internationally to the nearby countries of Georgia and Moldova. However, it left Georgia in 2021. As of October 2022, Nova Poshta Global currently has offices in Kyiv, London, and New York, as well as operations centers in Poland, Turkey, Germany, Spain, Italy, Latvia, Lithuania, Estonia, the Czech Republic, France, Romania, Slovakia, Hungary, Moldova, Canada, China (People's Republic), Thailand, Japan, Taiwan (Republic of China), Hong Kong, New Zealand, Malaysia, Singapore, Indonesia, South Korea, Australia, and Philippines.

In 2020 The "Nova Poshta" brand became one of the TOP-3 most expensive in Ukraine.

The company has 32 thousand employees and is among the best employers of Ukraine in 2020-2021.

On 24th of February 2022, on the first day of Russia's full-scale invasion of Ukraine, Nova Poshta donated UAH 25 million for the needs of the Ukrainian army. Also, the company launched Humanitarian Nova POSHTA project which is intended for free delivery of parcels to the military and victims of war.

In July, the main company announced that it would be opening non-Global branches in nearby European countries, planning to open in Poland before the end of 2022. In October, the first office opened in Warsaw, with another in Kraków, as well as Wrocław, Rzeszów, and Poznań, on the way.

Finances 
As a result of 2019, Nova Poshta paid over UAH 2.7 billion in taxes and was ranked 27th in the list of the top 100 largest companies in Ukraine by the amount of tax payments.

Nova Poshta is among the TOP-20 largest taxpayers in Ukraine. In 2020, the company paid 5 billion hryvnas.

Services 
Nova Poshta is the group of companies that provide clients — both businesses and individuals, logistics and related services, including express delivery of documents, freight and parcels. The group includes Ukrainian and foreign companies, in particular, NovaPay, Nova Poshta Global and Nova Poshta Moldova.

Nova Poshta has more than 8,700 branches throughout Ukraine - in all cities and in every fourth village. The Company continues to open new branches in the villages and builds the network of automated parcel terminals in the cities. For November 2021, the network of automated parcel terminals of Nova Poshta has more than 8,500 devices.

In 2020, the company delivered 327 million parcels and cargo for 14 million of its customers.

Infrastructure 
Nova Poshta has the modern sorting infrastructure in the million-plus cities and regional centers of the country. The largest of them are in Kyiv, Lviv, Khmelnytsky, Kharkiv and Dnipro. The terminals are equipped with automated equipment and can sort from 8.5 thousand to 50 thousand parcels per hour.
In addition, the 1/3 of Nova Poshta's terminals use robots to sort small parcels and cargo.

The Nova Poshta also tests innovative delivery methods. In the summer of 2021, the company delivered cargo by drone from Kyiv to Kharkiv, covering the distance of 480 km.

References

External links 
 Main company website
 Nova Poshta Moldova website
 Business English-language website

Postal system of Ukraine
Postal organizations
Logistics companies of Ukraine
Companies based in Kyiv
Express mail
Ukrainian companies established in 2001